Thomas & Friends is a children's television series about the engines and other characters working on the railways of the Island of Sodor, and is based on The Railway Series books written by the Reverend W. Awdry.

This article lists and details episodes from the ninth series of the show, which was first broadcast in 2005. This series was narrated by Michael Angelis for the United Kingdom audiences, while Michael Brandon narrated the episodes for the United States audiences.

Some episodes in this series have two titles: the original titles from the United Kingdom broadcasts are shown on top, while the American-adapted titles are shown underneath.

Production
The 30-minute episode format was unchanged from Series 8. 

Starting in this series, at the beginning of each half hour segment that aired in the United States, the characters' numbers would appear on their cabs and tenders, counting down from Henry, to Edward, and to Thomas. Then, the workmen would get Thomas ready for the new day and Thomas' driver would signal the workmen that Thomas was ready by blowing Thomas' whistle. Thomas  would soon be ready to start his adventures. Towards the end of each show, the countdown would begin again, and Thomas would return to the station. The workmen would get Thomas ready for the next day, and Thomas would go to sleep with a sleeping cap on his funnel. In later seasons broadcast in the United States, these segments were shortened to accommodate a plug for Lego's Duplo line of toys. 

Series 9 started filming in early 2005, and Sharon Miller began serving as script editor for this series.

Episodes

Characters

Introduced
 Molly ("Molly's Special Special")
 Neville ("Thomas and the New Engine")
 Dennis ("Thomas' Day Off")
 Mighty Mac ("Mighty Mac") 
 Mr. Percival (The Thin Controller) ("Mighty Mac")
 Proteus ("The Magic Lamp") (does not speak)

Recurring cast

 Thomas
 Edward
 Henry
 Gordon
 James
 Percy
 Toby
 Emily
 Bill and Ben
 Diesel
 Mavis
 'Arry and Bert
 Salty
 Harvey
 Skarloey
 Rheneas
 Peter Sam
 Rusty
 Duncan
 Annie and Clarabel
 Troublesome Trucks
 Bertie
 Trevor
 Harold
 Cranky
 The Fat Controller
 Dowager Hatt
 Sodor Brass Band
 Lady Hatt (does not speak)
 Farmer McColl (does not speak)
 Henrietta (cameo)
 George (cameo)
 Caroline (cameo)
 Butch (cameo)
 Tiger Moth (cameo)
 Stephen Hatt (cameo)
 Bridget Hatt (cameo)
 Mrs. Kyndley (cameo)
 The Refreshment Lady (cameo)
 Lord Callan (cameo)
 City of Truro (picture cameo)
 Cyril (indirectly mentioned)

References

2005 British television seasons
Thomas & Friends seasons